Neil Smith (born 1964) is a Canadian writer and translator from Montreal, Quebec. His novel Boo, published in 2015, won the Hugh MacLennan Prize for Fiction. Boo was also nominated for a Sunburst Award and the Canadian Library Association Young Adult Book Award, and was longlisted for the Prix des libraires du Québec.

Smith published his debut book, the short story collection Bang Crunch, in 2007. It was chosen as a best book of the year by the Washington Post and The Globe and Mail, won the McAuslan First Book Prize from the Quebec Writers' Federation, and was a finalist for the Hugh MacLennan Prize for Fiction. Three stories in the book were also nominated for the Journey Prize.

Smith also has a degree in translation and translates from French to English. The Goddess of Fireflies, his translation of Geneviève Pettersen's novel La déesse des mouches à feu, was nominated for the Governor General's Award for French to English translation at the 2016 Governor General's Awards.

His newest book of fiction, the novel Jones, was released in August 2022. It is the harrowing story of a pair of siblings attempting to survive the horror show of their family. It too was nominated for the Hugh MacLennan Prize for Fiction.

Literary translations
 Chloé Savoie-Bernard: Of roses and insects. Granta #141 Canada September 2017, pp. 137–142 (from the French)

References

External links
 Neil Smith profile at Penguin Random House Canada

1964 births
Canadian male short story writers
Canadian gay writers
Writers from Montreal
Living people
Canadian male novelists
21st-century Canadian novelists
Canadian LGBT novelists
21st-century Canadian translators
21st-century Canadian short story writers
21st-century Canadian male writers
Canadian male non-fiction writers
Gay novelists
21st-century Canadian LGBT people